Martin C. "Dill" Faulkes (born 1944) is a British businessman.

Faulkes has a Special Mathematics degree from Hull University and a PhD in mathematics from Queen Elizabeth College, London. He did postdoctoral work in general relativity.

He then left academia and went into software. He worked for the company Logica, then SPL, which was bought by Systems Designers. He then invested money in a variety of software companies and made a lot of money on the flotation of Triad and the private sale of SmartGroups.com.

He has made donations to a number of scientific causes and has had an asteroid (47144 Faulkes) named after him.

References

External links 
 Interview & biography
 Faulkes Educational Trust
 Faulkes Institute of Geometry
 Faulkes Telescope
 Faulkes Flying Foundation

1944 births
Living people
British philanthropists